Dartmouth Hall is the name for two buildings constructed on the same site and same stone foundation at Dartmouth College in Hanover, New Hampshire, since 1784. The current brick building was largely constructed from 1904 to 1906.

History
Construction of the original Dartmouth Hall began in 1784. The school originally planned to construct the building of brick, but eventually pine and oak were used instead due to greater availability and lesser cost. The Hall was the sole college building upon its completion in 1791, and was simply known as "the college" until at least 1828 when it was first referred to as Dartmouth Hall. The Hall survived a tornado in 1802 and fires in 1798 and 1848, which led to renovations being completed. The Hall remained the oldest College building on the Dartmouth campus until it burned in 1904. The 1904 fire destroyed almost the entire building, but much of the granite foundation was re-used, as were several original windows, granite steps, and metal from the damaged bell. Dartmouth Hall was rebuilt from 1904 to 1906 using brick instead of wood, but it was built to nearly identical dimensions as the original wooden building, making it a virtual replica. Lord Dartmouth laid the cornerstone in 1904. Currently the building houses the Department of French and Italian Languages and Literatures, Department of German Studies, and Department of Spanish and Portuguese Languages and Literatures.

References

External links
Official renovation site

Dartmouth College facilities